Vladimir Viktorovich Miridonov (born 5 January 1970) is a Russian professional football coach and a former player.

Club career
He made his professional debut in the Soviet Second League in 1988 for FC Krylia Sovetov Kuybyshev.

Post-playing career
From 2000 to 2004 he worked as a referee.

References

1970 births
Sportspeople from Samara, Russia
Living people
Soviet footballers
Russian footballers
Association football defenders
PFC Krylia Sovetov Samara players
Russian Premier League players
Russian football referees
Russian football managers